Robert Treviño (born 1984) is a Mexican-American conductor. He is currently music director of the Basque National Orchestra in Spain, principal guest conductor of the Orchestra Sinfonica Nazionale della RAI, and artistic advisor of the Malmö Symphony Orchestra in Sweden.

Biography
Treviño, who is Mexican American, grew up in the Fort Worth, Texas region, specifically in North Richland Hills, Texas.  As a youth, Treviño studied the bassoon.  Treviño attended the University of Texas at Arlington, where he studied conducting and formed his own orchestra. He then subsequently attended Roosevelt University, where his teachers included David McGill.

Treviño's conducting mentors have included Leif Segerstam, Kurt Masur, Michael Tilson Thomas, and David Zinman.  He made his professional debut as a conductor in 2003 at the age of 20 in Wuppertal, Germany.  In 2010, Treviño won the James Conlon Prize for Excellence in Conducting at the Aspen Music Festival and School.

From 2009 to 2011, Treviño was associate conductor for the New York City Opera.  He was then associate conductor at the Cincinnati Symphony Orchestra (CSO) from 2011 to 2015.

Treviño became music director of the Basque National Orchestra as of the 2017-2018 season. In June 2018, Treviño's contract with the orchestra was extended through the 2021–2022 season.  Treviño became chief conductor of the Malmö Symphony Orchestra as of the 2019-2020 season.  With the Malmö Symphony Orchestra, Treviño has recorded commercially for Ondine, including a Beethoven symphony cycle.  In May 2021, the Malmö Symphony Orchestra announced that Treviño is to stand down as its chief conductor at the close of the 2020-2021 season, and then to take the title of artistic adviser for 2 years.  Separately in May 2021, the RAI National Symphony Orchestra announced the appointment of Treviño as its next principal guest conductor, with a contract of 3 years, following his January 2019 guest-conducting debut with the orchestra and a return engagement in November 2020.

Awards and fellowships
 2010: James Conlon Prize for Excellence in Conducting at the Aspen Music Festival and School
 2010: Solti Foundation Career Assistance Award
 2011: "Bruno Walter National Conductor Preview" participant
 2011: Tanglewood Music Center Conducting Fellow
 2011: Laureate of the Evgeny Svetlanov International Conducting Competition
 2012: Solti Foundation Career Development Award

References

External links
 
 Künstleragentur Dr. Raab & Dr. Böhm agency, German-language page on Robert Treviño

1984 births
Living people
American male conductors (music)
21st-century American conductors (music)
21st-century American male musicians
American musicians of Mexican descent
University of Texas at Arlington alumni
People from Fort Worth, Texas